Wayuu: la niña de Maracaibo is a 2012 Venezuelan crime film directed by Miguel Curiel and starring Daniel Alvarado, Karina Velázquez and Asier Hernández. The film premiered in New York City in August 2005, and it opened in other countries, including Venezuela later that year.

Plot
The film centers about the impossible love between Gamero, the King of the Guajiros (Daniel Alvarado) and Chiquinquirá (Karina Velázquez), who decide to live their passional adventure, which is forbidden because he is a wayuu and she is an alijuna (non-wayuu). In order to protect the life of Chiquinquirá, Gamero hires Alatriste (Asier Hernández), a Basque detective with a past that torments him.

Production
Most of the filming was done in the region of La Guajira, in the north of the venezuelan state of Zulia, where the wayuu people live.

References

External links
 

2012 films
2012 crime action films
2012 crime thriller films
Venezuelan drama films
Basque-language films
2010s Spanish-language films
Wayuu-language films